The New England Black Wolves are a lacrosse team based in Uncasville, Connecticut playing in the National Lacrosse League (NLL). The 2019 season was the team's 5th season in the league.

Regular season

Current standings

Game log

Playoffs

Roster

Entry draft
The 2018 NLL Entry Draft took place on September 25, 2018. The Black Wolves made the following selections:

See also
2019 NLL season

References

New England Black Wolves seasons
New England Black Wolves
New England Black Wolves